The infinity mirror (also sometimes called an infinite mirror) is a configuration of two or more parallel or angled mirrors, which are arranged to create a series of smaller and smaller reflections that appear to recede to infinity. Often the front mirror of an infinity  mirror is half-silvered (a so-called one way mirror), but this is not required to produce the effect. A similar appearance in artworks has been called the Droste effect. Infinity mirrors are sometimes used as room accents or in works of art.

Descriptions

In a classic self-contained infinity mirror, a set of light bulbs, LEDs, or other point-source lights are placed around the periphery of a fully reflective mirror, and a second, partially reflective "one-way mirror" is placed a short distance in front of it, in a  parallel alignment. When an outside observer looks into the surface of the partially reflective mirror, the lights appear to recede into infinity, creating the appearance of a tunnel of great depth that is lined with lights.

If the mirrors are not precisely parallel but instead are canted at a slight angle, the "visual tunnel" will be perceived to be curved off to one side, as it recedes into infinity.

Alternatively, this effect can also be seen when an observer stands between two parallel fully reflective mirrors, as in some dressing rooms, some elevators, or a house of mirrors. A weaker version of this effect can be seen by standing between any two parallel reflective surfaces, such as the glass walls of a small entry lobby into some buildings. The partially-reflective glass produces this sensation, diluted by the visual noise of the views through the glass into the surrounding environment.

Explanation of effect 
The 3D illusion mirror effect is produced whenever there are two parallel reflective surfaces which can bounce a beam of light back and forth an indefinite (theoretically infinite) number of times. The reflections appear to recede into the distance because the light actually is traversing the distance it appears to be traveling.

For example, in a two-centimeter-thick infinity mirror, with the light sources halfway between, light from the source initially travels one centimeter.  The first reflection travels one centimeter to the rear mirror and then two centimeters to, and through the front mirror, a total of three centimeters.  The second reflection travels two centimeters from front mirror to back mirror, and again two centimeters from the back mirror to, and through the front mirror, totaling four centimeters, plus the first reflection (three centimeters) making the second reflection seven centimeters away from the front mirror.  Each successive reflection adds four more centimeters to the total (the third reflection appears 11 centimeters deep, fourth 15 centimeters, and so on).

Each additional reflection adds length to the path the light must travel before exiting the mirror and reaching the viewer. Each reflection of the light reduces the brightness of the image, which also fades into the distance.

Cultural references
Visual artists, especially contemporary sculptors, have made use of infinity mirrors. Yayoi Kusama, Josiah McElheny, Ivan Navarro, Taylor Davis, Anthony James, and Guillaume Lachapelle have all produced works that use the infinity mirror to expand the sensation of unlimited space in their artworks.

The contemporary classical composer Arvo Pärt wrote his 1978 composition Spiegel im Spiegel ("mirror in the mirror") as a musical reflection on the infinity mirror effect.

See also

References

External links

Mirrors
Novelty items
Optical illusions
Mirror
Optical toys
Light art